In the United States, student loans are a form of financial aid intended to help students access higher education. In 2018, 70 percent of higher education graduates had used loans to cover some or all of their expenses. With notable exceptions, student loans must be repaid, in contrast to other forms of financial aid such as scholarships, which are not repaid, and grants, which rarely have to be repaid. Student loans may be discharged through bankruptcy, but this is difficult.

Student loan debt has proliferated since 2006, totaling $1.73 trillion by July 2021. In 2019, students who borrowed to complete a bachelor's degree had about $30,000 of debt upon graduation.  Almost half of all loans are for graduate school, typically in much higher amounts.  Loan amounts vary widely based on race, social class, age, institution type, and degree sought. As of 2017, student debt constituted the largest non-mortgage liability for US households. Research indicates that increasing borrowing limits drives tuition increases.

Student loan defaults are disproportionately common in the for-profit college sector. The schools whose students have the highest amount of debt are University of Phoenix, Walden University, Nova Southeastern University, Capella University, and Strayer University. Except for Nova Southeastern, they are all for-profit. In 2018, the National Center for Education Statistics reported that the 12-year student loan default rate for  colleges was 52 percent. As of 2012, 39 percent of federal student loan defaults occurred for people who attended for-profit colleges.

The default rate for borrowers who do not complete their degree is three times the rate for those who did. A 2018 Brookings Institution study projected that "nearly 40 percent of students who took out loans in 2004 may default by 2023."

History
Federal student loans were first offered in 1958 under the National Defense Education Act (NDEA). They were available only to select categories of students, such as those studying engineering, science, or education. The program was established in response to the Soviet Union's launch of the Sputnik satellite. It addressed the widespread perception that the United States had fallen behind in science and technology. Student loans became more broadly available in the 1960s under the Higher Education Act of 1965, with the goal of encouraging greater social mobility and equal opportunity.

In 1967, the publicly-owned Bank of North Dakota made the first federally-insured student loan.

The US first major government loan program was the Student Loan Marketing Association (Sallie Mae), formed in 1973.

Before 2010, federal loans included:
 loans originated and funded directly by the Department of Education (DOE)
 government guaranteed loans originated and funded by private investors.
Direct-to-consumer private loans were the fastest-growing segment of education finance. The "percentage of undergraduates obtaining private loans from 2003–04 to 2007–08 rose from 5 percent to 14 percent" and was under legislative scrutiny due to the lack of school certification.

The rules for disability discharge underwent major changes as a result of the Higher Education Opportunity Act of 2008. The regulations took effect July 1, 2010. In June 2010, the amount of student loan debt held by Americans exceeded the amount of credit card debt held by Americans. At that time, student loan debt totalled at least $830 billion, of which approximately 80% was federal and 20% was private. By the fourth quarter of 2015, total outstanding student loans owned and securitized had surpassed $1.3 trillion.

Guaranteed loans were eliminated in 2010 through the Student Aid and Fiscal Responsibility Act and replaced with direct loans. The Obama administration claimed that guaranteed loans benefited private companies at taxpayer expense but did not reduce student costs.

The Health Care and Education Reconciliation Act of 2010 (HCERA) ended private-sector lending under the Federal Family Education Loan Program (FFELP) starting July 1, 2010; all subsidized and unsubsidized Stafford loans, PLUS loans, and Consolidation loans are under the Federal Direct Loan Program.

As of July 1, 2013, borrowers determined to be disabled by the Social Security Administration would be accepted for loan discharge if the SSA placed the individual on a five- to seven-year review cycle. As of January 1, 2018, the Tax Cuts and Jobs Act of 2017 established that debt discharged due to the death or disability of the borrower was no longer treated as taxable income. (This provision is scheduled to sunset on December 31, 2025.)

In an effort to improve the student loan market, LendKey, SoFi (Social Finance, Inc.) and CommonBond began offering student loans and refinancing at lower rates than traditional lenders, using an alumni-funded model. According to a 2016 analysis by online student loan marketplace Credible, about 8 million borrowers could qualify for refinancing.

The Federal Reserve Bank of New York's February 2017 Quarterly Report on Household Debt and Credit reported 11.2% of aggregate student loan debt was 90 or more days delinquent.

On July 25, 2018, Education Secretary Betsy DeVos issued an order declaring that the Borrower Defense Program (enacted in November 2016), would be replaced with a stricter repayment policy, effective July 1, 2019. When a school closes for fraud before conferring degrees, students would have to prove that they were financially harmed. As of 2018, 10% of borrowers were in default after three years and 16 percent after five years.

In 2019, President Donald Trump ordered loan forgiveness for permanently disabled veterans, saving 25,000 veterans an average of $30,000 each. The same year, Theresa Sweet and other student loan debtors filed a claim against the US Department of Education, arguing that they had been defrauded by their colleges. The debtors filed under a rule known as Borrower Defense to Repayment. 

As of the end of 2020, loan balances totaled $1.7 trillion.

In 2021, student loan servicers began dropping out of the federal student loan business, including FedLoan Servicing on July 8, Granite State Management and Resources on July 20, and Navient on September 28. According to Sallie Mae, as of 2021, 1 in 8 families lenders are using private student loans when federal financing doesn't cover all college costs.

In July 2021, the U.S. Second Circuit Court of Appeals ruled that private student loans are dischargeable in bankruptcy, following two other cases.

In August 2021, the Biden administration announced it would use executive action to cancel $5.8 billion in student loans held by 323,000 people who are permanently disabled.

Starting in March 2020, federal student loan borrowers received temporary relief from student loan payments during the COVID-19 pandemic. This relief was subsequently extended multiple times, and is set to expire at the end of June 2023.

According to repayment data released by the Education Department, in December 2021, just 1.2 percent of borrowers were continuing to pay down their loans during the over two years of optional deferment.

In February 2023, the U.S. Supreme Court was scheduled to hear oral arguments in Biden v. Nebraska concerning President Biden's order to cancel student loan debt for an estimated 40 million debtors.

Overview 

Student loans play a significant role in U.S. higher education. Nearly 20 million Americans attend college each year, of whom close to 12 million or 60% borrow annually to help cover costs. As of 2021, approximately 45 million Americans held student debt, with an average balance of approximately $30,000.

In Europe, higher education receives more government funding, making student loans less common. In parts of Asia and Latin America government funding for post-secondary education is lower usually limited to flagship universities, like UNAM in Mexico and government programs under which students can borrow money are uncommon.

In the United States, college is funded by government grants, scholarships, loans. The primary grant program is Pell grants.

Student loans come in several varieties, but are basically either federal loans or private student loans. Federal loans are either subsidized (the government pays the interest) and unsubsidized. Federal student loans are subsidized for undergraduates only. Subsidized loans generally defer payments and interest until some period (usually six months) after the student has left school. Some states have their own loan programs, as do some colleges. In almost all cases, these student loans have better conditions than private loans.

Student loans may be used for college-related expenses, including tuition, room and board, books, computers, and transportation.

Demographics
Approximately 30% of all college students do not borrow. In 2019, the average undergraduate who had taken on debt had a loan balance of about $30,000 upon graduation. Almost half of the student loans are for graduate education, and those loan amounts are typically much higher.

Social class
According to the Saint Louis Federal Reserve Bank, "existing racial wealth disparities and soaring higher education costs may replicate racial wealth disparities across generations by driving racial disparities in student loan debt load and repayment."

Low-income students often prefer grants and scholarships over loans because of their difficulty repaying them. In 2004, 88.5% of Pell Grant recipients who had Bachelor’s degrees graduated with student loan debt. After college, students struggle to break into a higher income bracket because of the loans they owe. Though, it’s been shown that when it comes to student loan forgiveness and advocacy around this issue, lower-socioeconomic groups are the ones most motivated to contact their legislators about student loans. In 1995, 64 percent of students whose family incomes falling below $35,000 were contacting their legislators concerning student loans.

Race and gender
According to the New York Times, "recent black graduates of four-year colleges owe, on average, $7,400 more than their white peers. Four years after graduation, they still owe an average of $53,000, almost twice as much as whites."

According to an analysis by Demos, 12 years after entering college:
 White men paid off 44 percent of their student-loan balance
 White women paid off 28 percent
 Black men saw their balances grow 11 percent
 Black women saw their loan balances grow 13 percent

Age
According to a CNBC analysis, the highest student debt balances are carried by adults aged 25–49, with the lowest debt loads held by those aged 62 and older.

As of 2021, approximately 7.8 million Americans from 18-25 carry student loan debt, with an average balance of almost $15,000. For adults between the ages of 35 and 49, the average individual balance owed exceeded $42,000. The average debt for adults between 50 to 61 is slightly lower. These balances include loans for their education and their children.

Federal loans

Loans to students

Stafford and Perkins loans were federal loans made to students. These loans did not consider credit history (most students have no credit history); approval was automatic if the student met program requirements. Nearly all students are eligible to receive federal loans.

Payment/discharge 
The student makes no payments while enrolled at least half-time. If a student drops below half time or graduates, a six-month deferment begins. If the student returns to least half-time status, the loans are again deferred, but a second episode no longer qualifies and repayment must begin. All Perkins loans and some undergraduate Stafford loans are subsidized. Loan amounts are limited.

Many deferment and forbearance options are offered in the Federal Direct Student Loan program. Disabled borrowers have the possibility of discharge. Other discharge provisions are available for teachers in specific critical subjects or in a school that has more than 30% of its students on reduced-price lunch. They qualify for discharge of Stafford, Perkins, and Federal Family Education Loan Program loans up to $77,500. Any person employed full-time by a 501(c)(3) non-profit group, or another qualifying public service organization, or serving in a full-time AmeriCorps or Peace Corps position, qualifies for discharge after 120 qualifying payments. However, loan discharge is considered taxable income. Loans discharged that were not the result of long-term public service employment constitute taxable income.

Subsidies are conditional depending on financial need. Pricing and loan limits are determined by Congress. Undergraduates typically receive lower interest rates, while graduate students typically can borrow more. Disregarding risk has been criticized as contributing to inefficiency. Financial needs may vary from school to school. The government covers interest charges while the student is in college. For example, those who borrow $10,000 during college owe $10,000 upon graduation.

Terms 
Loans are guaranteed by DOE, either directly or through guarantee agencies.

The dependent undergraduate limits are $5,500 per year for freshman undergraduates, $6,500 for sophomore undergraduates, and $7,500 per year for junior and senior undergraduates, as well as students enrolled in teacher certification or coursework preparatory for graduate programs.

For independent undergraduates, the limits are $9,500 per year for freshmen, $10,500 for sophomores, and $12,500 per year for juniors and seniors, as well as students enrolled in teacher certification or preparatory coursework for graduate programs.

Unsubsidized loans are also guaranteed, but interest accrues during study. Nearly all students are eligible for these loans regardless of financial need. Those who borrow $10,000 during college owe $10,000 plus interest upon graduation. Accrued interest is added to the loan amount, and the borrower makes payments on the total. Students can make payments while studying.

Graduate students have higher limits: $8,500 for subsidized Stafford and $12,500 (varying by course of study) for unsubsidized Stafford. For graduate students, the Perkins limit is $6,000 per year.

Stafford loan aggregate limits 
Stafford borrowers cannot exceed aggregate limits for subsidized and unsubsidized loans. For dependent undergraduates, the aggregate limit is $57,500, while subsidized loans are limited to $23,000. Students who reach the maximum in subsidized loans may (based on grade level—undergraduate, graduate/professional, etc.) add a loan of less than or equal to the amount they would have been eligible for in subsidized loans. Once aggregate limits are met, the student is ineligible for additional Stafford loans until they pay back a portion of the borrowed funds. A student who has paid back some of these amounts regains eligibility up to the aggregate limits as before. Graduate students have a lifetime aggregate loan limit of $138,500.

Debt statistics 
 Direct loans ($1.15 trillion, 34.2 million borrowers)
 FFEL loans ($281.8 billion, 13.5 million borrowers). The program ended in 2010.
 Perkins loans ($7.1 billion, 2.3 million borrowers). The program ended in 2018.
 Total ($1.4392 trillion, 42.9 million borrowers)

Loans to parents 
PLUS loans are federal education loans made to parents. These have much higher loan limits, usually enough to cover costs that exceed student financial aid. Payments start immediately after education ends, although prepayment is allowed. Credit history is considered; thus, approval is not automatic.

Interest accrues during the time the student is in school. PLUS interest rates as of 2017 were 7%.

The parents are personally responsible for repayment. The parents sign the master promissory note and are accountable. Parents are advised to consider their monthly payments. Loan documents reflect the repayment schedule for a single year. Since most students borrow again each year, the ultimate payments are much higher. PLUS loans consider credit history, making it more difficult for low-income parents to qualify.

Graduate students are eligible to receive PLUS loans in their own names. Graduate PLUS loans have the same interest rates and terms as those to parents.

Federal Direct Student Loans, also known as Direct Loans or FDLP loans, originate with the United States Treasury. FDLP loans are distributed by the DOE, then to the college or university and then to the student.

Debt levels

Loan limits are below the cost of most four-year private institutions and most public universities. Students add private student loans to make up the difference.

The maximum amount that any student can borrow is adjusted as federal policies change.

Defaults 
Out of 100 students who ever attended a for-profit institution, 23 defaulted in the 1996 cohort compared to 43 in the 2004 cohort (compared to an increase from 8 to 11 among borrowers who never attended a for-profit).

As of 2018 black BA graduates defaulted at five times the rate of white BA graduates (21 versus 4 percent), and were more likely to default than white dropouts.

Private loans
Private loans are offered by banks or finance companies. They are not guaranteed by a government agency. Private loans cost more, offer less favorable terms, and are generally used only when students have exhausted the federal borrowing limit. They are not eligible for Income-Based Repayment plans, and frequently have less flexible payment terms, higher fees, and more penalties, than federal student loans. They cannot be discharged through bankruptcy.

Private loans are made to students or parents. They have higher limits and no payments until after education, although interest starts to accrue immediately and the deferred interest is added to the principal. Interest rates are higher on federal loans, which are set by the United States Congress.

The advantage of private student loans is that they do not include loan or total debt limits. They typically offer a no-payment grace period of six months (occasionally 12 months).

Most experts recommend private loans only as a last resort, because of the less favorable terms.

Loan types
Private student loans generally come in two types: school-channel and direct-to-consumer.

School-channel loans offer borrowers lower interest rates, but generally take longer to process. These loans are "certified" by the school, which means the school signs off on the borrowing amount, and the funds are disbursed directly to the school. The "certification" means only that the school confirms the loan funds will be used for educational expenses only and agrees to hold them and disburse them as needed. Certification does not mean that the school approves of, recommends, or has even examined the loan terms.

Direct-to-consumer private loans do not involve the school. The student supplies enrollment verification to the lender, and the loan proceeds are disbursed directly to the student. While direct-to-consumer loans generally carry higher interest rates than school-channel loans, they allow families access to funds more quickly — in some cases, in a matter of days. This convenience comes at the risk of student over-borrowing and/or use of funds for inappropriate purposes.

Loan providers range from large education finance companies to speciality companies that focus exclusively on this niche.

Interest rates
Private student loans usually have substantially higher interest rates, and the rates fluctuate depending on the financial markets. Some private loans require substantial up-front origination fees ("points") along with lower interest rates. Interest rates also vary depending on the applicant's credit history.

Most private loan programs are tied to financial indexes such as the Wall Street Journal Prime rate or the BBA LIBOR rate, plus an overhead charge. Students and families with excellent credit generally receive lower rates and smaller loan origination fees than those with poorer credit histories. Interest payments are tax deductible.

Lenders rarely give complete details of loan terms until after an application is submitted. Many lenders advertise only the lowest interest rate they charge (for good credit borrowers). Borrowers with damaged credit can expect interest rates that are as much as 6% higher, loan fees that are as much as 9% higher, and loan limits that are two-thirds lower than those advertised figures.

Loan fees
Private loans often carry an origination fee, which can be substantial. Origination fees are a one-time charge based on the amount of the loan. They can be paid from the loan proceeds or from personal funds independent of the loan amount, often at the borrower's preference. Some lenders offer low-interest, 0-fee loans. The origination fee gets paid once, while interest is paid throughout the loan. The loan amount accumulates to about 15 billion borrowed from private loans.

All lenders are legally required to provide a statement of the annual percentage rate (APR) prior to closure. Unlike the "base" rate, this rate includes any fees charged and can be thought of as the "effective" interest rate including interest, fees, etc. When comparing loans, comparing APR rather than "rate" ensures a valid comparison for loans that have the same repayment term. However, if the repayment terms are different, APR becomes a less-perfect comparison tool. In those circumstances comparing total financing costs may be more appropriate.

Loan terms
In contrast with federal loans, whose terms are standardized, private loan terms vary from loan to loan. However, it is not easy to compare them, as some conditions may not be revealed until signing. A common suggestion is to consider all terms, not just respond to advertised interest rates. Applying to multiple lenders (to create a comparison) can damage the borrower's credit score. Examples of other terms  that vary by lender are deferments (amount of time after leaving school before payments start) and forbearances (a period when payments are temporarily stopped due to financial or other hardship).

Cosigners
Private student loan programs generally issue loans based on the credit history of the applicant and any applicable cosigner, co-endorser or coborrower. Students may find that their families have too much income or too many assets to qualify for federal aid, but lack sufficient assets and income to pay for school without assistance. Most students need a cosigner in order to qualify for a private loan.

Many international students can obtain private loans (they are usually ineligible for federal loans) with a cosigner who is a citizen or permanent resident. However, some graduate programs (notably top MBA programs) partner with private loan providers. In those cases, no cosigner is needed for international students.

Loan servicers
The U.S Department of Education contracts with companies to manage, or service, the loans it owns. These companies are the primary point of contact for borrowers after they graduate and enter repayment.

, the six companies which service student loans are Aidvantage, ECSI, EdFinancial Services, MOHELA (Higher Education Loan Authority of the State of Missouri), Nelnet, and OSLA (Oklahoma Student Loan Authority).

Student loan asset-backed securities (SLABS)
FFELP and private loans are bundled, securitized, rated, then sold to institutional investors as student loan asset-backed securities (SLABS). Navient and Nelnet are two major private lenders. Wells Fargo Bank, JP MorganChase, Goldman Sachs and other large banks package and sell SLABS in bundles. Moody's, Fitch Ratings, and Standard and Poor's rate SLAB quality.

The Asset-Backed Security (ABS) industry received financial relief in 2008 and in 2020 through the Term Asset-Backed Securities Loan Facility (TALF) program, which was created to preserve the flow of credit to consumers and businesses, including student loans. In 2020, critics argued that the SLAB market was poorly regulated and could be headed toward a significant downturn, despite perceptions that it was low risk.

Repayment and default

Metrics
The industry metrics are repayment rate and default rate, such as the one-, three-, five-, and seven-year default rates. DOE's College Scorecard includes the following repayment statuses:
 Making Progress
 Forbearance
 Deferment
 Not Making Progress
 Delinquent
 Defaulted
 Paid In Full
 Discharged

Repayment rate
The three-year repayment rate for each school that receives Title IV funding is available at DOE's College Scorecard. This number may be a poor indicator of the overall default rate: some schools place loans into forebearance, deferring loans beyond the three-year window to present a low default rate.

Default rate
The default rate for borrowers who did not complete their degree is three times as high as the rate for those who did.

Standard repayment
Federal loans are initially designated as standard repayment. Standard repayment borrowers have 10 years to repay. The loan servicer calculates the monthly payment amount that will pay off the original loan amount plus all accrued interest after 120 equal payments.

Payments cover interest and part of the principal. Some loan terms may be shorter than 10 years. The minimum monthly payment is  $50.

Income-related repayment

Income-based repayment

If loan debt is high but income is modest or zero, borrowers may qualify for an income-driven repayment (IDR) plan. Most major types of federal student loans—except for PLUS loans for parents—are eligible. IDRs allow borrowers to cap their monthly payments at 10%, 15%, or 20% of disposable income for up to 20 or 25 years, after which the remaining balance is forgiven.

Four IDRs are available:
 Income-Based Repayment (IBR)
 Pay As You Earn (PAYE)
 Revised Pay As You Earn (REPAYE)
 Income-Contingent Repayment (ICR)

Income share agreements 

An income share agreement is an alternative to a traditional loan. The borrower agrees to pay a percentage of their salary to the educational institution after graduation. Purdue University offers income share agreements.

Defenses to repayment
Under some circumstances, debt can be cancelled. For example, students who attended a school when it closed or the student was enrolled based on false claims may be able to escape repayment.

Leaving the country to evade repayment
Debt evasion is the intentional act of trying to avoid attempts by creditors to collect a debt. News accounts report that some individuals are departing the US to escape their debt. Emigration does not discharge the loan or stop interest and penalties from accruing.

Nations may enter into agreements with the US to facilitate the collection of student loans.

After default, co-signers remain liable for repayment.

Bankruptcy

Federal loans and some private loans can be discharged in bankruptcy by demonstrating that the loan does not meet the requirements of section 523(a)(8) of the bankruptcy code or by showing that repayment of the loan would constitute "undue hardship". While credit card debt often can be discharged through bankruptcy proceedings, this option is not generally available for education-related debt. Unless the loan can be proven not to be an educational benefit, those seeking to discharge their debt must initiate an adversary proceeding, a separate lawsuit within the bankruptcy case where they illustrate the required hardship. Many borrowers cannot afford the costs to retain an attorney or litigation costs associated with an adversary proceeding, such as a bankruptcy case. The undue hardship standard varies from jurisdiction to jurisdiction, but is generally difficult to meet. In most circuit courts discharge depends on meeting the three prongs in the Brunner test: As noted by the district court, there is very little appellate authority on the definition of "undue hardship" in the context of 11 U.S.C. § 523(a)(8)(B). Based on legislative history and the decisions of other district and bankruptcy courts, the district court adopted a standard for "undue hardship" requiring a three-part showing: (1) that the debtor cannot maintain, based on current income and expenses, a "minimal" standard of living for herself and her dependents if forced to repay the loans; (2) that additional circumstances exist indicating that this state of affairs is likely to persist for a significant portion of the repayment period of the student loans; and (3) that the debtor has made good faith efforts to repay the loans. For the reasons set forth in the district court's order, we adopt this analysis. The first part of this test has been applied frequently as the minimum necessary to establish "undue hardship." See, e.g., Bryant v. Pennsylvania Higher Educ. Assistance Agency (In re Bryant), 72 B.R. 913, 915 (Bankr.E.D.Pa.1987); North Dakota State Bd. of Higher Educ. v. Frech (In re Frech), 62 B.R. 235 (Bankr.D.Minn.1986); Marion v. Pennsylvania Higher Educ. Assistance Agency (In re Marion), 61 B.R. 815 (Bankr.W.D.Pa.1986). Requiring such a showing comports with common sense as well.While federal loans can be discharged administratively for total and permanent disability, private loans can be discharged only via bankruptcy. One study found that a quarter million student debtors file for bankruptcy each year. Approximately 450 attempted to seek a discharge in 2017 by arguing that their loan was not an "educational benefit" as defined by section 523(a)(8), or they successfully argued for "undue hardship". Of the completed cases, more than 60% were able to discharge their debts or achieve a settlement. The study concluded that the data showed: Creditors are settling unfavorable cases to avoid adverse precedent and litigating good cases to cultivate favorable precedent. Ultimately, this litigation strategy has distorted the law and cultivated the myth of nondischargeability.The study found that debtors who obtain favorable outcomes do not possess unique characteristics differentiating them from those who do not seek discharge and estimates that 64,000 individuals who filed for bankruptcy in 2019 would have met the hardship standard. It concluded about half of all bankrupt debtors could obtain relief, except that they had become convinced that loans were not dischargeable.

For disabled debtors the standard is whether "substantial gainful activity" (SGA) is still possible Borrowers determined to be disabled by the Social Security Administration, are eligible if the SSA placed the individual on a five- to seven-year review cycle. Debt discharged due to death or total permanent disability is nontaxable.

In three circuit court jurisdictions private student loans are dischargeable in bankruptcy.

Criticisms

School effects 
Some critics of financial aid in general claim that it allows schools to raise their fees, to accept unprepared students, and to produce too many graduates in some fields of study.

In 1987, then-Secretary of Education William Bennett argued that “... increases in financial aid in recent years have enabled colleges and universities blithely to raise tuition, confident that Federal loan subsidies would help cushion the increase.” This statement came to be known as the “Bennett Hypothesis”.

In July 2015, a Federal Reserve Bank of New York Staff Report concluded that institutions more exposed to increases in student loan program maximums tended to respond with disproportionate tuition increases. Pell Grant, subsidized, and unsubsidized loans led to increases of about 40, 60, and 15 cents on the dollar, respectively. In the 20 years between 1987 and 2007, tuition costs rose 326%. Public universities increased their fees by 27% over the five years ending in 2012, or 20% adjusted for inflation. Public university students paid an average of almost $8,400 annually for in-state tuition, while out-of-state students paid more than $19,000. For the two decades ending in 2013, college costs rose 1.6% more than inflation each year. By contrast, government funding per student fell 27% between 2007 and 2012.

Many students cannot get loans or determine that the cost of going to school is not worth the debt, believing that they would still be unable to make enough income to pay it back.

Some universities steered borrowers to preferred lenders that charged higher interest rates. Some of these lenders allegedly paid kick backs to university financial aid staff. After the behavior became public, many universities rebated fees to affected borrowers.

Interest rates 
The federal student loan program was criticized for not adjusting interest rates according to factors under students' control, such as the choice of academic major. Critics have contended that flat-rate pricing contributes to inefficiency and misallocation of resources in higher education and lower productivity in the labor market. However, one study found that high debt and default levels do not burden society substantially.

Bankruptcy 
In 2009 student loans' non-dischargeability was claimed to provide a credit risk-free loan for the lender, averaging 7 percent a year.

Long-term debt and default 
About one-third of borrowers never pay off their loans. Those who default shift their burden to taxpayers.

According to Harvard Business School researchers, "when student debt is erased, a huge burden is lifted and people take big steps to improve their lives: They seek higher-paying careers in new states, improve their education, get their other finances in order, and make more substantial contributions to the economy."

Sallie Mae and Nelnet 
Sallie Mae and Nelnet are the largest lenders and are frequently defendants in lawsuits. The False Claims Suit was filed on behalf of the federal government by former DOE researcher Dr. Jon Oberg against Sallie Mae, Nelnet, and other lenders. Oberg argued that the lenders overcharged the United States Government and defrauded taxpayers of over $22 million. In August 2010, Nelnet settled and paid $55 million. Ultimately seven lenders returned taxpayer funds as a result of his lawsuits.

School quality 
In April 2019, Brookings Institution fellow Adam Looney, a long-time analyst of student loans, claimed that:"It is an outrage that the federal government offers loans to students at low-quality institutions even when we know those schools don’t boost their earnings and that those borrowers won’t be able to repay their loans. It is an outrage that we make parent PLUS loans to the poorest families when we know they almost surely will default and have their wages and social security benefits garnished and their tax refunds confiscated, as $2.8 billion was in 2017. It is an outrage that we saddled several million students with loans to enroll in untested online programs that seem to have offered no labor market value. It is an outrage that our lending programs encourage schools like USC to charge $107,484 (and students to blithely enroll) for a master’s degree in social work (220 percent more than the equivalent course at UCLA) in a field where the median wage is $47,980. It’s no wonder many borrowers feel their student loans led to economic catastrophe."

Potential consequences of student loan debt 
While college grads earn about 70% more than people with only a high school degree, student loan debt has been associated with several social, economic, and psychological consequences, including:
 having to choose less satisfying work that pays more
 lower credit ratings from missed payments that may disqualify borrowers from work opportunities given poor payment history
 reduced wealth accumulation
 reduced housing access
 delayed marriage
 delayed childbirth
 increased anxiety

Reform proposals 
Organizations that advocate for student loan reform include the Debt Collective and Student Loan Justice.

Some pundits proposed that colleges share liability on defaulted student loans.

Sen. Bernie Sanders (I-Vt.) and Rep. Pramila Jayapal (D-Wash.) introduced legislation in 2017 to "make public colleges and universities tuition-free for working families and to significantly reduce student debt." The policy would eliminate undergraduate tuition and fees at public colleges and universities, lower interest rates, and allow those with existing debt to refinance. Sanders offered a new proposal in 2019 that would cancel $1.6 trillion of student loan, undergraduate and graduate debt for around 45 million Americans.

Senator Brian Schatz (D-Hawaii) reintroduced the Debt Free College Act in 2019.

In 2020, a majority of economists surveyed by the Initiative on Global Markets felt that forgiving all student loans would be more beneficial to higher income earners than lower income earners.

During the 2020 presidential election, then-candidate Joe Biden said he planned to allow $10,000 in debt forgiveness to all student debtors. On August 24, 2022, Biden announced that he would forgive an amount of $10,000 for an estimated 43 million borrowers, and an additional $10,000 for Pell Grant recipients, with this relief limited to singles earning under $125,000 and married couples earning under $250,000, including refunding payments during the forbearance period by any borrower who requests it. This will reduce debt for an estimated 43 million borrowers and eliminate student loan debt for an estimated 20 million.  The Congressional Budget Office estimated that it will cost the government about $400 billion. The administration also proposed a new income-driven repayment plan.

Some borrowers still have loans issued under the Federal Family Education Loan Program which closed in 2010. The Biden forgiveness plan originally allowed these borrowers to receive forgiveness by consolidating into Direct Loans, but due to potential lawsuits stopped allowing this on September 29, 2022, potentially excluding 800,000 FFEL borrowers.

See also
 Student financial aid in the United States
 College tuition in the United States
 EdFund
 Free education
 Higher Education Price Index
 Tertiary education
 Private university
 Student debt
 Student loan
 Tuition payments
 Tuition freeze

References

Further reading
 Best, J. and Best, E. (2014) The Student Loan Mess: How Good Intentions Created a Trillion-Dollar Problem. Atkinson Family Foundation.
 Loonin, Deanne. Student loan law: Collections, intercepts, deferments, discharges, repayment plans, and trade school abuses. Boston: National Consumer Law Center, June 30, 2006. 
 Student loan program: A journey through the world of educational lending, collection, and litigation. Mechanicsburg, Pennsylvania Pennsylvania Bar Institute, c2003. vii, 300 p. : forms; 28 cm. ASIN B000IB82QA
 Wear Simmons, Charlene. Student Loans for Higher Education. Sacramento, California: California Research Bureau, California State Library, 2008. 59 pages.

External links

 "College, Inc.", PBS FRONTLINE documentary, May 4, 2010
 "Student Loan Debt Clock

 
United States
Education finance in the United States